Roderic Broadhurst is a criminal justice practitioner, academic, and author. He is an Emeritus Professor at the School of Regulation and Global Governance (RegNet) and Fellow of the Research School of Asian and the Pacific at the Australian National University (ANU).

Broadhurst's research interest areas are in criminology, with a current emphasis on organized crime in China and Asia, and crime in cyberspace. His most notable contributions to the field, include chapters in publications, such as the Oxford Handbook of Organized Crime, Oxford Handbook of Cyber Security, and Asian Handbook of Criminology, and co-authoring three books, including Violence and the Civilising Process in Cambodia.

In 2005, Broadhurst founded and served for three years as Editor-in-Chief of the Asian Journal of Criminology.

Education
Broadhurst received a B.A. in Government and Politics from the University of Western Australia in 1973, followed by a B.Ed. in Special Education from the same university in 1980. In 1983, he earned an M.Phil. in Criminology from the Cambridge Institute of Criminology. Following this, he completed a PhD in Criminal Justice in 1994 from the Faculty of Law at the University of Western Australia, with a thesis titled "Evaluating Penal Policy and Imprisonment in Western Australia: an analysis of return to prison." He also holds a Certificate in Counselling from the Psychodrama Institute of Australia (1981) and is an Associate Consultant with the United States Institute of Analytical Interviewing (2000).

Career
Broadhurst began his academic career in 1990 as Senior Lecturer & Research Fellow in the Crime Research Centre of the Law School at the University of Western Australia and completed his doctorate in 1994. Subsequently, he held an appointment as a lecturer in the Department of Sociology at the University of Hong Kong, and was appointed as an associate professor there in 2005. He then left Hong Kong and joined the School of Justice in the Faculty of Law at the Queensland University of Technology as a professor. In 2009, he was appointed Professor of Criminology at the Australian National University (ANU) and in 2021, became Professor Emeritus in the ANU School of Global Governance and Regulation (REGNET).

Broadhurst founded the University of Hong Kong Centre for Criminology in 1998, which was followed by appointments as the Secretary and Chair of the Hong Kong Criminology Society until 2006. He also served as the Head of the School of Justice Queensland University of Technology from 2005 till 2008, the external assessor of City University of Hong Kong from 2004 till 2014, and was formerly (2010-2013) the deputy director of the Australian Research Council, Centre of Excellence in Policing and Security at ANU.

Research
Broadhurst's research has focused on criminology topics such as lethal violence, victimization, and longitudinal research on recidivism and dangerous offending. His current research concentrates on cybercrime and organized and transnational crime.

Organized crime in Asia
Broadhurst has conducted research on organized and transnational crime, particularly in the Indo-Asia Pacific region. Through his research studies, he has identified weak governance structures and inadequate law enforcement resources as significant challenges in combatting transnational organized crime, and proposed strategies such as regional cooperation, capacity building for police forces, intelligence sharing, border control measures, and anti-money laundering regulations.

Broadhurst has undertaken research on crime victims in Cambodia and China, as well as administering UN crime victimization surveys in both countries. His co-authored book, Business and the Risk of Crime in China presented the findings of a victimization survey conducted in major Chinese cities, including Hong Kong and Shanghai, analyzing both conventional and non-conventional crimes and their impact on businesses, with key policy implications discussed. Specifically, his work on organized crime in China revealed that its resurgence, including groups similar to triads, is due to modernization, globalization, and the country's transition from communism to Chinese state capitalism, and their strong ties to local governments, businesses, and international criminal networks. Having examined the nature and prevalence of crime in Hong Kong since post-war 1945, his 2004 work with Chan and Beh investigated homicide-suicide (HS) in a Chinese population and found that most events were motivated by domestic disputes, and depression was common among offenders with low socio-economic backgrounds in Hong Kong.

While undertaking field work on violence and crime trends in post-conflict Cambodia, Broadhurst estimated homicide rates and identified a decline in violent crimes and homicides, but a lack of confidence in the police. It was also established that foreign aid has contributed to an ineffective legal framework for defining human trafficking, which then enables an inefficient justice system to prosecute vulnerable individuals. More recently, he discussed the growth of organized crime in Asia and its connection to the increase in recreational drug use, including ATS, synthetic opiates, and cocaine. He argued that criminal networks thrive on profitable opportunities and suggested countermeasures such as restricting exports of precursor chemicals.

Crime in cyberspace
Broadhurst has contributed to understanding of cybercrime in Asia by providing an overview of its development and law-enforcement response, and has identified the challenges that need to be addressed for effective cross-national policing of cybercrime within this region. He has evaluated the international efforts to combat cyber-crime, focusing on mutual legal assistance, and has noted the quick execution of traditional crimes in the online space, as well as the global threat posed by malicious codes.

Broadhurst and colleagues at the ANU Cybercrime Observatory researched the challenges posed by the cross-border nature of computer-related crimes, which render many established methods ineffective, even in advanced nations, and reviewed the nature of cybercrime groups and their activities, covering definition, scope, theoretical challenges, and empirical evidence. One of his highly cited studies has provided examples of individual and group behavior, including state actors, and described various types of cybercrime based on a typology proposed by McGuire. Additionally, his research has highlighted the involvement of criminal organizations in different levels of cybercrime, from enterprise to protest activities, which require specialized leadership and structure for successful execution. He also evaluated criminal activity linked to spam and suggested understanding offender tactics, victim vulnerabilities, and collaborating with non-state actors to combat spam as an effective in reducing the harms for cybercrime.

Recidivism and restorative justice
Broadhurst has conducted substantial criminology research aimed at reducing recidivism and rehabilitating offenders. Together with Ross Maller, he applied one of the earliest applications of survival (actuarial) analysis to the calculation of recidivism rates. They drew on a longitudinal data set of prisoners released for the first time from the Western Australian Prison population, and reported the risks of re-offending increased with incarceration and high rates of recidivism among indigenous prisoners. In related research, he estimated probabilities of re-incarceration, and identified predictive factors for recidivist behavior.

Exploring the relationship between Aboriginal cultural strength, socioeconomic stress, and imprisonment rates, he noted that states with higher Aboriginal cultural strength and socioeconomic stress had evolved more punitive justice systems for Aboriginal people. He also explored the over use of imprisonment among indigenous Australians arising from the interaction of Aboriginal people with the Australian criminal justice system, including their representation in courts and prisons, police activity, community corrections, access to victim services, and findings from the Royal Commission into Deaths in Custody. Directing his research efforts towards investigating alternative measures such as restorative justice he analyzed (with co-author Kathy Daly) the general and sexual re-offending rates of South Australian youth charged with sexual offenses and compared the outcomes of court, conference, and specialist treatment cases using a Weibull mixture model, taking into account prior offending and other factors. He, along with researchers from the Australian National University and the Australian Institute of Criminology, determined the restorative justice conferencing program had high satisfaction levels among victims and offenders, and lower reoffending rates, compared to young offenders processed through the normal system.

Bibliography

Books
Aboriginal Contact with the Criminal Justice System and the Impact of the Royal Commission into Aboriginal Deaths in Custody (1995) ISBN 9781876067014 
Business and the Risk of Crime in China (2011) ISBN 9781921862533
Violence and the Civilising Process in Cambodia (2015) ISBN 9781107109117

Selected articles
Broadhurst, R. G., & Maller, R. A. (1992). The recidivism of sex offenders in the Western Australian prison population. The British Journal of Criminology, 32(1), 54–80.
Chan, A. Y., Beh, S.L., & Broadhurst, R.G. (2003). Homicide-suicide in Hong Kong 1989–1998. International Journal of Forensic Science, 137(2-3), 165–171.
Broadhurst, R. (2006). Developments in the global law enforcement of cyber‐crime. Policing: An International Journal of Police Strategies & Management, 29(3), 408–433.
Broadhurst, R., Grabosky, P., Alazab, M., Bouhours, B., & Chon, S. (2014). An analysis of the nature of groups engaged in cybercrime. International Journal of Cyber Criminology, 8(1), 1-20.
Broadhurst, R. (2018). Criminal innovation and illicit global markets-transnational crime in Asia. Australasian Policing, 10(3).
Broadhurst, R., Maller, R., Maller, M. & Bouhours, B. (2018), ‘The Recidivism of Homicide Offenders in Western Australia’, Australian and New Zealand Journal of Criminology, 51: 395–41.
Broadhurst R., Ball M., & Trivedi H. (2020). Fentanyl Availability on Darknet Markets. Trends and Issues in Criminal Justice, No 590 Australian Institute of Criminology, Canberra.

References